Sophie, Princess of Prussia (born Princess Sophie Johanna Maria of Isenburg; 7 March 1978) is the wife of Georg Friedrich, Prince of Prussia, head of the formerly-ruling House of Hohenzollern.

Early life and education

Princess Sophie Johanna Maria of Isenburg was born on 7 March 1978 in Frankfurt, West Germany, to Franz-Alexander, Prince of Isenburg (born 1943), and his wife, Countess Christine Saurma, Baroness von und zu der Jeltsch (born 1941).
Her father is head of the Birstein branch of the House of Isenburg, a mediatized Catholic line of Princes of the Holy Roman Empire, who lost their independence in 1815. She has two sisters, Archduchess Katharina of Austria-Este and Isabelle, Dowager Princess of Wied, and two brothers, Alexander, Hereditary Prince of Isenburg, and Prince Viktor.

Growing up at Birstein Castle, the family seat in Hesse, Sophie studied at a primary school in Birstein and at Marienschule Fulda in Fulda. She then attended the boarding school Kloster Wald and passed her A-Levels as well as a trade test as a dressmaker. Sophie studied Business Administration at the University of Freiburg and Humboldt University of Berlin and worked at a firm that offers consulting services for nonprofit business.

Marriage and issue
On 25 August 2011, Sophie civilly married Georg Friedrich, Prince of Prussia, at Potsdam's Stadthaus by Jann Jakobs, Mayor of Potsdam. The religious wedding took place at the Church of Peace on 27 August 2011, in commemoration of the 950th anniversary of the founding of the House of Hohenzollern. The wedding was covered live by German broadcaster RBB. The 700 guests included: Prince Hassan bin Talal and Princess Sarvath al-Hassan of Jordan; Prince Laurent of Belgium; Lord and Lady Nicholas Windsor; and then Crown Princess Margareta of Romania. Following the ceremony, a reception was held on the grounds of the Sanssouci palace.

Issue
Sophie and Georg Friedrich have four children:
 Carl Friedrich Franz Alexander, Hereditary Prince of Prussia (born 20 January 2013)
 Prince Louis Ferdinand Christian Albrecht of Prussia (born 20 January 2013)
 Princess Emma Marie Charlotte Sofia of Prussia (born 2 April 2015)
 Prince Heinrich Albert Johann Georg of Prussia (17 November 2016)

Ancestry

References

1978 births
Living people
German princesses
German Roman Catholics
House of Hohenzollern
House of Isenburg
People from Frankfurt
Prussian princesses